Nemozoma is a genus of beetles belonging to the family Trogossitidae.

The species of this genus are found in Europe and Northern America.

Species:
 Nemozoma caucasicum Ménétriés, 1832 
 Nemozoma cornutum Sturm, 1826

References

Trogossitidae